Indelibly Stamped is the second album by the English rock band Supertramp, released in 1971. It marked a dramatic change in direction to a more straightforward rock sound, and by admission of the band's own liner notes, "Travelled" is the only song with any resemblance to their debut album. Like their debut, this album was a commercial failure upon release, but in later decades it went gold in France and Canada. Original editions have a colour gate-fold cover and different text for the band name and album title. The cover photograph features the tattooed torso and arms of a topless woman. This is the first Supertramp album issued in the U.S.; the cover was in colour (in 1971), but A&M pasted two gold stars over the nipples. The album was banned from a number of record stores in Australia, while others sold each copy inside a brown paper sleeve.

Cover art
The cover depicts the tattooed torso and arms of a topless woman. According to Paul Sayce, writing in Tattoo News, the model was Marion Hollier, who was extensively tattooed at the Les Skuse Tattoo Studio in the 1960s. An article published in The People shortly after the album's release also identifies Hollier as the model, noting that she was paid £45 for the job.

Background
Roger Hodgson later said Indelibly Stamped was "the survival album to put ourselves back in the good books of our manager. There was no theme worked out for the album and we were floundering." New members Kevin Currie, Frank Farrell, and Dave Winthrop were all recruited shortly before the recording sessions.

The song "Times Have Changed" evolved out of a song called "Times of Rain", which was written with Richard Palmer-James while he was still a member of the group. Rick Davies and Roger Hodgson wrote new lyrics to the song, renaming it "Times Have Changed".

Supporting tours for the album began with a series of shows at the P.N. Club in Munich, which had been the site for Supertramp's first public performances. Rick Davies described their stage show at the time as "all Rock and Roll really. We used to get people up on the bloody stage and it was just chaos, hopping away doing about three encores, but there was meat and potatoes behind it. No more or less people would come to the next gig." This was the last album Roger Hodgson played bass during his tenure with Supertramp.

Reception

In his brief retrospective review, AllMusic's Stephen Thomas Erlewine said that the album was an improvement over their debut, but still indulged too much in lengthy instrumental sections.

Track listing
All songs written by Rick Davies and Roger Hodgson, except where noted.

All lead vocals by Rick Davies, except where noted.

"Rosie Had Everything Planned" is the only original song in the entire Supertramp catalog for which Rick Davies receives no writing or co-writing credit.

Personnel
Supertramp
 Rick Davies – acoustic and Wurlitzer pianos, Hammond organ, lead vocals, harmonica 
 Roger Hodgson – acoustic and electric guitars, bass guitar (track 3), lead (tracks 2, 3, 10) and backing vocals
 Dave Winthrop – flute, saxophones, lead vocals (track 6)
 Frank Farrell – bass guitar (all tracks except track 3), piano and accordion (track 3), backing vocals
 Kevin Currie – percussion, drums

Production
 Producer: Supertramp
 Engineer: Bob Hall

Charts

Weekly charts

Certifications and sales

References

Supertramp albums
1971 albums
A&M Records albums
Albums produced by Rick Davies
Albums produced by Frank Farrell (musician)
Albums produced by Roger Hodgson
Albums recorded at Olympic Sound Studios